Catalina Maya Arango (born July 28, 1980 in Betulia, Antioquia, Colombia ), known professionally as Catalina Maya, is a Colombian model, broadcaster and businesswoman.

Early life and education 
Maya grew up in Medellín, Antioquia, Colombia, where she attended San José de Las Vegas school. She studied Social Communication and Journalism from 1998 to 2004 at the Pontifical Bolivarian University. In 2000 she interned for a semester at the press office in Casa de Nariño, the Colombian presidential house.

Career

Modeling 
She began her modeling career at age thirteen when she accompanied Catalina Gómez to the InForma casting agency, in Medellín. The casting directors invited her to be part of the presentation, from which she was chosen for the campaign for Almacenes Éxito. Afterwards, Maya started receiving offers to model for television commercials and brands in Colombia and other countries. In Colombia, she is widely remembered for her photos which appeared on the cover of student notebooks in the late 1990s and early 2000s.

Maya has appeared in more than 300 campaigns throughout her career.

Television and radio 
Maya worked at W Radio (Colombia) in 2004, at the time she met her first husband. She returned to W Radio in 2012, working from Monday to Friday from 5pm to 8pm at La Hora del Regreso (The Comeback Time). 
At the age of seventeen she started to frequently make special coverings for Caracol Radio. She has played minor roles in television soap operas such as Padres e Hijos (Parents and Children). Since August 2019, she has been invited to the Despierta America morning show in Univision Network, for weekly appearances on the segment Sin Rollo (Without Issue).

Youtuber 
In October 2019 Catalina launched her YouTube channel ‘Bueno, Bonito y barato’ (Good, Nice and Cheap) where she gives tips and hacks for beauty, cleaning and more.

Business 
Several times a year, Maya hosts a design fair called "Los Bazares de Catalina Maya" to promote new Latin-American designers.

Personal life
She is the youngest of three sisters. On March 11, 2005, Catalina Maya married Adrián Fernández, a racing car driver. They had two children together. In 2012, they separated by mutual agreement. On March 17, 2018, after four years of relationship, she married businessman Felipe Pimiento.
 
In 2005, she put her modeling career on pause to be a mother until 2012 when she returned to live in Miami.

Filmography

Television

Reality Shows

Model 
 Johnson & Johnson
 Palmolive
 Trident (gum)
 Coca-Cola
 Aguila
 Carulla
 Cromos

References

External links

1980 births
Living people
Colombian female models
Colombian telenovela actresses
Colombian television actresses
Actresses from Bogotá
Pontifical Bolivarian University alumni
21st-century Colombian actresses
Colombian artists
Colombian businesspeople
People from Antioquia Department
Colombian journalists
Colombian women journalists
Colombian radio presenters
Colombian women radio presenters
Spanish-language YouTubers
Colombian YouTubers